The 1989 Kangaroo Tour of New Zealand was a mid-season tour of New Zealand by the Australia national rugby league team. The Australians played six matches on tour, including a three test series against the New Zealand national rugby league team. The tour began on 4 July and finished on 23 July.

Australia, the reigning Rugby League World Cup champions after having defeated New Zealand 25–12 in the 1988 World Cup Final at Auckland's Eden Park ground, defeated the home side 3–0 in the series. The third test of the series also doubled as the first match of the 1989–1992 Rugby League World Cup tournament.

The series was broadcast to Australia by the Nine Network with commentary provided by Ray Warren and Darrell Eastlake.

As of 2017, this remains the last full mid-season Kangaroo tour of New Zealand in which the Australians played against club and regional teams.

Leadership
Don Furner had stepped down after three successful years as coach and was replaced by 1978 Kangaroo tour captain and Manly-Warringah's 1987 premiership winning coach Bob Fulton. Wally Lewis was the captain of the side as he had been since 1984 while Manly-Warringah's Paul Vautin was the team vice-captain. Vautin captained the team in the three non-test games of the tour.

Touring squad
Queensland had won the 1989 State of Origin series with a 3–0 clean sweep of New South Wales prior to the tour. Of the 20 man touring team, 12 were from Qld with 8 from NSW. Balmain Tigers front rower Steve Roach was the only tourist who had not played in the Origin series.

Only 10 players from the touring party would go on to be selected for the 1990 Kangaroo tour of Great Britain and France.

|- bgcolor="#CCCCFF"
| Player
| Club
| Position(s)
| Games
| Tests
| Tries
| Goals
| F/Goals
| Points
|-
|- bgcolor="#FFFFFF"
| Greg Alexander
|  Penrith Panthers
| 
| 5
| 2
| 5
| –
| –
| –
|-
|- bgcolor="#FFFFFF"
| Sam Backo
|  Brisbane Broncos
| 
| 6
| 3
| 1
| –
| –
| 4
|-
|- bgcolor="#FFFFFF"
| Gary Belcher
|  Canberra Raiders
| 
| 5
| 3
| 3
| –
| –
| 12
|-
|- bgcolor="#FFFFFF"
| Martin Bella
|  North Sydney Bears
| 
| 3
| –
| –
| –
| –
| –
|-
|- bgcolor="#FFFFFF"
| Bradley Clyde
|  Canberra Raiders
| 
| 4
| 3
| 1
| –
| –
| 4
|-
|- bgcolor="#FFFFFF"
| Tony Currie
|  Brisbane Broncos
| 
| 5
| 3
| 2
| –
| –
| 8
|-
|- bgcolor="#FFFFFF"
| Michael Hancock
|  Brisbane Broncos
| 
| 6
| 3
| 3
| –
| –
| 12
|-
|- bgcolor="#FFFFFF"
| Des Hasler
|  Manly-Warringah Sea Eagles
| 
| 4
| 2
| 1
| –
| –
| 4
|-
|- bgcolor="#FFFFFF"
| Peter Jackson
|  Brisbane Broncos
| 
| 3
| –
| –
| –
| –
| –
|-
|- bgcolor="#FFFFFF"
| Wally Lewis (c)
|  Brisbane Broncos
| 
| 3
| 3
| –
| –
| –
| –
|-
|- bgcolor="#FFFFFF"
| Bruce McGuire
|  Balmain Tigers
| 
| 5
| 2
| –
| –
| –
| –
|-
|- bgcolor="#FFFFFF"
| Mal Meninga
|  Canberra Raiders
| 
| 3
| 3
| 1
| 8
| –
| 20
|-
|- bgcolor="#FFFFFF"
| Michael O'Connor
|  Manly-Warringah Sea Eagles
| 
| 5
| 2
| 3
| 15
| –
| 42
|-
|- bgcolor="#FFFFFF"
| Steve Roach
|  Balmain Tigers
| 
| 5
| 3
| –
| –
| –
| –
|-
|- bgcolor="#FFFFFF"
| Dale Shearer
|  Manly-Warringah Sea Eagles
| 
| 5
| 3
| 5
| –
| –
| 20
|-
|- bgcolor="#FFFFFF"
| Paul Sironen
|  Balmain Tigers
| 
| 3
| 2
| 1
| –
| –
| 4
|-
|- bgcolor="#FFFFFF"
| Dan Stains
|  Cronulla-Sutherland Sharks
| 
| 3
| –
| –
| –
| –
| –
|-
|- bgcolor="#FFFFFF"
| David Trewhella
|  Eastern Suburbs Roosters
| 
| 3
| –
| –
| –
| –
| –
|-
|- bgcolor="#FFFFFF"
| Paul Vautin (vc)
|  Manly-Warringah Sea Eagles
| 
| 6
| 3
| –
| 1
| –
| 2
|-
|- bgcolor="#FFFFFF"
| Kerrod Walters
|  Brisbane Broncos
| 
| 5
| 3
| 1
| –
| –
| 4
|-

Tour
The Australians played six games on the tour, winning five.

New Zealand XIII:  Morvin Edwards, Sam Panapa, Dave Watson, Tea Ropati, David Ewe, Kelly Shelford, Phil Bancroft, George Mann, Duane Mann, Russell Tuuta, Shane Hansen, Francis Leota, Mike Kuiti (c). Res - Gary Mercer, Peter Brown.

Australia:  Gary Belcher, Michael O'Connor, Peter Jackson, Tony Currie, Michael Hancock, Des Hasler, Greg Alexander, Sam Backo, David Trewhella, Steve Roach, Bruce McGuire, Dan Stains, Paul Vautin (c). Res - Kerrod Walters, Martin Bella.

First test

Auckland:  Carl Magatogia, Sam Panapa, Mike Patton, Dave Watson, Kevin Pulieta, Kelly Shelford (c), Neville Ramsay, Mike Thomson, Peter Ropati, George Mann, Tawera Nikau, Francis Leota, Shane Hansen. Res - Tea Ropati, Taime Tagaloa. Coach - Cameron Bell

Australia:  Dale Shearer, Michael O'Connor, Peter Jackson, Tony Currie, Michael Hancock, Des Hasler, Greg Alexander, Sam Backo, David Trewhella, Martin Bella, Dan Stains, Bruce McGuire, Paul Vautin (c). Res - Bradley Clyde.

The 26-24 loss to Auckland was the Kangaroos first loss to a club or provincial team since losing 12-11 to NZ side South Island during the 1980 NZ tour. As of 2021 it remains the last time an Australian side has lost a non-test match. This was also the last time the Australians would play a match at Carlaw Park.

Second test

Wellington:  Morvin Edwards, David Ewe, George Lajpold, Charlie McAlister, Victor Aramoana, Geoffrey Tangira, Sibi Raika, Arnold Lomax, Barry Harvey (c), Daroa Ben-Moide, Sonny Whakarau, Kelly Makoare, Mike Kuiti.

Australia:  Gary Belcher, Michael O'Connor, Peter Jackson, Dale Shearer, Michael Hancock, Paul Vautin (c), Greg Alexander, Steve Roach, David Trewhella, Martin Bella, Dan Stains, Paul Sironen, Bruce McGuire. Res - Kerrod Walters, Sam Backo.

As of 2017, this remains the last game Australia has played against a NZ club or provincial side.

Third test
The dead rubber third test also doubled as the first game of the 1989–1992 Rugby League World Cup tournament. It also saw the first time that the Mount Smart Stadium would host a rugby league test match. Australia's vice-captain Paul Vautin played his 13th and last test match. Tony Currie, Sam Backo and Bruce McGuire also played their last tests. With Paul Sironen out injured, Mal Meninga moved into the second row. After 9 tests on the wing, Dale Shearer played his first test at centre with Michael O'Connor coming in on the wing. This would also be the 24th and last time Wally Lewis would captain Australia in a test match.

During the second half of the game, Australian captain Wally Lewis pulled off a massive (but fair) hit on Kiwi fullback Darrell Williams. Lewis later told that he thought he was lining up Brendon Tuuta who had produced a fair bit of foul play through the series, only to look down at the tackled player and find it was Williams and not Tuuta.

Statistics
Leading Try Scorer
 5 by Greg Alexander and Dale Shearer

Leading Point Scorer
 42 by Michael O'Connor (3 tries, 15 goals)

Largest Attendance
 26,000 - Second test vs New Zealand at Rotorua International Stadium

Largest non-test Attendance
 9,000 - Australia vs Auckland at Carlaw Park

References

Rugby league tours of New Zealand
Australia national rugby league team tours
Kangaroo tour of New Zealand
Kangaroo tour of New Zealand